The Malay Chetty creole language (also known as Malaccan Creole Malay, Malacca Malay Creole and Chitties/Chetties Malay) is a Malay-based creole spoken by the Chetties, a distinctive group of Tamil people found mainly in Malacca in Malaysia and Singapore, who are also known as the "Indian Peranakans" and have adopted Chinese and Malay cultural practices whilst also retaining their Hindu heritage.

Spoken since the 16th century by descendants of Tamil merchants of the Malacca Straits, Malay Chetty creole may be historically related to Sri Lanka Creole Malay. The current language status is moribund, due to inter-marriage and out-migration. There has been a language shift towards Malay instead.

Malay Chetty creole is a mix of Malay, Tamil and English, although the latter's presence in the creole is not as prominent compared to the first two languages. Because of the strong influence of Malay on this creole, Malay Chetty creole is not very different from other Malay dialects, especially the Middle Malacca Malay dialect. That said, despite the many similarities to other Malay dialects, Malay Chetty creole is considered a creole for two reasons, one, a pidgin becomes a creole once it's become the mother tongue of a community and two, unlike a pidgin, a creole develops as a language in terms of vocabulary, structure, style and others to accommodate its function as a mother tongue.

As Malay Chetty creole is very similar to other Malay dialects in terms of structure, it is generally not very different from other Malay dialects. Nonetheless, it does have its own unique features.

Malay Chetty creole shares many features with Baba Nyonya Malay, suggesting that they may have come from the same source language with the source language being Bazaar Malay.

Phonology

Comparison with Standard Malay

Deletion of the Phonemes r and h 

 Final /r/ is omitted
 benar /bənar/ > [bəna] 'true'
 /h/ is omitted in initial, final and mid positions except in a few words
 hijau /hid͡ʒau/ > [id͡ʒo] 'green'
 tahu /tahu/ > [tau] 'know'
 darah /darah/ > [dara] 'blood'

Monophthongisation 

 Final /ai/ is reduced to half-closed front [e]
 pakai /pakai/ > [pake] 'wear'
 FInal /au/ is reduced to half-closed back [o]
 pulau /pulau/ > [pulo] 'island'

Phoneme Deletion in Consonant Clusters in Transyllabic Words 

 Mid consonant cluster /mb/ is reduced to [m]
 sembilan /səmbilan/ > [səmilan] 'nine'

Phoneme Insertion 

 Glottal [ʔ] is inserted at word final position in words that end with /a/, /i/ and /u/
 bawa /bawa/ > [bawaʔ] 'bring'
 cari /t͡ʃari/ > [t͡ʃariʔ] 'search'
 garu /garu/ > [garoʔ] 'scratch'

Vocabulary

References 

Malay-based pidgins and creoles
Languages of Malaysia
Pidgins and creoles